Bartosz Nowicki (born 26 February 1984 in Gryfice) is a Polish middle distance runner.

Achievements

Personal bests
Outdoors
 800m 1:46.81 (Bydgoszcz 2007)
 1000m 2:21.14 (Königs Wusterhausen 2007)
 1500m 3:36.68 (Rehlingen 2011)
 Mile 3:57.19 (London 2011)
 3000 7:58.68 (Rehlingen 2007)

Indoors
 800m 1:47.42 (Karlsruhe 2008)
 1500m 3:38.90 (Karlsruhe 2011)
 2000m 5:07.84 (Metz 2013) – NR

References
 IAAF profile

1984 births
Living people
Polish male middle-distance runners
People from Gryfice
Sportspeople from West Pomeranian Voivodeship
21st-century Polish people